Hannes Taljaard (b. Daniël Johannes Taljaard in 1971, Siloam, Venda, South Africa) is a South African classical music composer.

Taljaard's compositions have been performed in South Africa and Europe and he won first prize in the Flores Iuventutis competition in Ghent, Belgium in 1994/95. He is senior lecturer in composition and composer-in-residence
at the School of Music & Conservatory at North-West University in Potchefstroom, South Africa. He has taken masterclasses with American composer George Crumb and has taken private lessons with Belgian composer Wim Henderickx in Antwerp from 1996 to 2000. He has also attended the Darmstadt New Music Summer School. He is editor of academic publication The South African Music Teacher.

His compositions are influenced by African (see African music) and Arabic music.

Orchestral works 
 Sarabande (1996) (Violin and Symphony Orchestra)

Chamber music 
 Komas, ‘n Koker en drie Spieëls (1992) (Clarinet, Violoncello/Bassoon, Piano)
Impromptu (1993) (Cello solo)
Nacht und Träume (1993) (Clarinet, Piano)
Metaphor I (1996-1998) (Any mixed ensemble with ten performers and conductor/composer)
Introverz (1996-1997) (Cello solo)
Movement for String Quartet (1998)
Les Sarabandes (1999-2001) (Piano trio) For the Erasmus Trio
Lullaby (2000-2001) (Bassoon and vibraphone) For Andrea Bressan and Saverio Tasca
Sloka (1999-2001) (Bassoon solo)

Piano music 
Fünf zärtliche Bagatellen Fünf zärtliche Bagatellen (1993) (solo) (1993) (solo)
Drie Nokturnes 1998 vir Bart se konsert in Lier (solo). For Bart Meuris
Two Lullabies (2001) (solo)
En Rêve – Rêvant (2003) (two pianos)

Choral music 
Nova Cantica Sacra (1987-1898) SATB, SSAATTBB, SMATbB, some with soloists
Meditation I (1998) SSSS, AAAA, TTTT, BBBB
Uittelrympies (1999) for children’s choir with violin, flute, cello and piano
Raaiselrympies en snelsêers (1999) SSATbB (soli)
Thula Sthandwa (2001) SMMA
Rymelary (1999-2001) SSATbB
Thula Sthandwa (2002) SMATbB

Solo vocal works 
Song for Simeon (1993-1994) (Bariton, Clarinet, Bassoon, Violins I & II, Cello Piano) Poem by Thomas Stearns Elliot
Drei Gebete (1994-1995) (Bariton, 2 Celli). Texts form the Lutheran Prayer Book
Wiegieliedjies (Boek 1) (1999) (Soprano, Clarinet, Bassoon, Piano) For Erica Eloff. Traditional texts.
Wiegieliedjies (Boek 2) (1999-2001) (Soprano, 2 Flutes, 2 Clarinets, Bassoon, Violin, Cello, Harp, Piano Duo) For Erica Eloff. Traditional texts
Easter Hymn – STABAT MATER (2002) (Soprano, Clarinet, Bassoon, Piano) For Erica Eloff. An English text by Hannes Taljaard translated into Latin by Willemien Viljoen and Hannes Taljaard

References

External links 
African Composers 
New Music South Africa 

21st-century classical composers
South African composers
South African male composers
Living people
1971 births
Male classical composers
21st-century male musicians